Blue's Journey is a side-scrolling platform game released by Alpha Denshi in 1990 on SNK's Neo Geo MVS arcade system and their AES home system. It was ported to the Neo Geo CD in 1994. It was rereleased on the Wii's Virtual Console in Europe on November 9, 2007, followed by North America on November 12, 2007.

Gameplay 

Blue has the ability to stun enemies, pick them up and throw them as projectiles. He can also shrink himself down in order to access hidden areas. A second player can take control of a unnamed green palette swap of Blue.

Plot 

In the game the player controls a heroic young man named Blue who was sent by Princess Fa to save the peaceful planet of Raguy. The planet is inhabited by insect people (Insectarians) and Blue is in love with the Princess Fa. It has been invaded by the evil Daruma Empire, who plans on consuming the planet's resources and polluting it.

There are several endings different endings in the game depending on certain events such as whether or not the player defeated their rival.

Development and release

Reception 

RePlay reported Blue's Journey to be the sixth most-popular arcade game at the time. The game received generally positive reception from critics since its release in arcades and other platforms, most of which unanimously praised the colorful graphics. Both the Neo Geo and Nintendo Switch versions hold a 48.75% and 50% respectively on the review aggregator GameRankings. AllGames Kyle Knight praised the "cutesy" and colorful graphics when compared to other systems released at the time such as the Nintendo Entertainment System and Sega Genesis, as well as the multiple pathways but ultimately regarded its gameplay as average, noting that it lacked difficulty. Consoles Plus Pingos and Badin highly commended the presentation for being varied, simple controls and multiple paths but noted that the music was repetitive. GameFan and GamePro gave high remarks the colorful visuals, music, characters, gameplay and controls but Andrew Cockburn of the former publication noted its short length.

Hobby Consolas Marcos García highly praised the technical presentation, colorful graphics, samba-style soundtrack, numerous secrets, bosses, gameplay and two-player co-op feature. Joypads Alain Huyghues-Lacour and Seb, as well as Joystick Jean-Marc Demoly, noted its low difficulty level but commended the animated graphics, controls and audio. Player Ones Cyril Drevet gave positive remarks to the colorful graphics, sprite animations, sound, difficulty and longevity. Tilts Laurent Defrance and Jean-Michel Maman regarded it as a cross between Marvel Land and Sonic the Hedgehog, while Génération 4s Frank Ladoire also drew comparison with Super Mario Bros.. Both publications praised the colorful graphics, fluid animations, responsive controls and soundtrack, with both Defrance and Maman stating that Blue's Journey was an original and varied adventure-platform game. Consolemanias Marco Auletta criticized the graphics and sound for being simplistic and bland respectively, as well as its gameplay for being frustrating.

In recent years, Blue's Journey has been met with a more mixed reception from critics. Eurogamers Dan Whitehead criticized the visuals for being "crude and blotchy", recommending Super Mario Bros. 3 on the Wii's Virtual Console instead. GameSpots Frank Provo praised the sound design and sountrack but criticized the graphics and gameplay. IGNs Lucas M. Thomas regarded the title as a passable platform game. In 2014, HobbyConsolas identified it as one of the twenty best games for the Neo Geo AES.

Notes

References

External links 
 Blue's Journey at GameFAQs
 Blue's Journey at Giant Bomb
 Blue's Journey at Killer List of Videogames
 Blue's Journey at MobyGames

1990 video games
ACA Neo Geo games
ADK (company) games
Arcade video games
Cooperative video games
D4 Enterprise games
Fantasy video games
Multiplayer and single-player video games
Neo Geo games
Neo Geo CD games
Nintendo Switch games
PlayStation Network games
PlayStation 4 games
Platform games
Side-scrolling platform games
SNK games
Video games featuring female protagonists
Video games scored by Yuka Watanabe
Virtual Console games
Video games developed in Japan
Xbox One games
Hamster Corporation games